Jerome Arnold (born Romeo Maurice Arnold; November 12, 1936, Chicago) is an American bassist, known for his work with Howlin' Wolf, and The Paul Butterfield Blues Band in the 1960s.

As an original member of the Butterfield band, he was subsequently inducted into the Rock and Roll Hall of Fame in 2015.

His playing appears on the albums The Paul Butterfield Blues Band and East-West. He was a member of the Butterfield Band at the Newport Folk Festival in 1965, and not only appeared with the band there, but was among the musicians who supported Bob Dylan on the Newport Folk Festival stage for Dylan's controversial amplified instrument performance at that Festival.

Jerome Arnold is a younger brother of Billy Boy Arnold, as is harmonicist Augustus "Gus" Arnold (who around 1969 changed his name to "Julio Finn"). He also appears on Billy Boy Arnold's 1964 Prestige LP, "More Blues on the South Side."

Discography

With Howlin' Wolf
The Real Folk Blues (Chess, 1956-64 [1965])

References

Living people
1936 births
Musicians from Chicago
Paul Butterfield Blues Band members
20th-century American bass guitarists